Larry Lyden (born November 11, 1943) is an American wrestler. He competed in the men's Greco-Roman 78 kg at the 1968 Summer Olympics.

References

External links
 

1943 births
Living people
American male sport wrestlers
Olympic wrestlers of the United States
Wrestlers at the 1968 Summer Olympics
Sportspeople from Minneapolis